Mea Mater Elizabeth High School is a private Nigerian secondary school institution. It is a boarding school. The school opened in September 2004. It is located in the village of Ojiagu in Agbani, Enugu.

School makeup
The principal is Mr. Jude Isienyi. The school is divided into the junior school, or year 7 to year 9, and the senior school, or year 10 to year 12. Students are divided into four houses; red, blue, green and yellow. Students come from all over Nigeria, such as Lagos, Port Harcourt, Abuja and Warri. International students who may attend Mea Mater come from all corners of the world, including the U.S., Canada, United Kingdom, Germany, Ireland, and Italy. There is an entrance examination outlet and center in Abuja.  A student by the name Chinenye Amanze was presented an African leadership academy award. The school was also noted as one of the best performed schools in Africa in the year 2011.

References

Boarding schools in Nigeria
Secondary schools in Enugu State
Buildings and structures in Enugu State
Educational institutions established in 2004
2004 establishments in Nigeria